White Flames is the first solo album by British blues guitarist Snowy White, released in 1983. It includes the song "Bird of Paradise", which reached No. 6 on the UK charts when it was released as a single.

The album has been issued with several different track lists and at least once under the title Bird of Paradise, after the hit single. It was remastered and reissued on CD in 2010 with the bonus track "For the Rest of My Life", a non-album B-side recorded live in the studio. Several songs differ slightly between the vinyl and CD editions of the album, with alternative mixes or edits in addition to the altered running order.

Track listing

Personnel
Snowy White – guitars, vocals
Kuma Harada – bass guitar, double bass
Jess Bailey – keyboards, moog synthesizer, electric piano (except tracks 1, 2) (LP)
Richard Bailey – drums, percussion
Godfrey Wang – string synthesizer (tracks 1, 2) (LP)

Production
Tom Newman – producer (except tracks 1, 2), engineer (except tracks 1, 7)
Kuma Harada – producer (tracks 1, 2)
Snowy White – production assistant
Martin Adam – remixing and engineering (tracks 1, 2)
Chris Porter – engineer
Bernd Matheja – sleeve notes (CD)
Alan Ballard – photography (LP back sleeve)
Chris Craymer – photography
Kouji Shimamura – cover concept and artwork
Bob England – project director

Charts

References

Snowy White albums
1983 debut albums
Albums produced by Tom Newman (musician)